Paracleros maesseni, Maessen's dusky dart, is a butterfly in the family Hesperiidae. It is found in Ghana and Nigeria (the Cross River loop).

References

Butterflies described in 1978
Erionotini